Rai Sahab Bhanwar Singh College (RSB College) is a private educational institute located in Nasrullaganj, Sehore district. It is part of Jai Research Research & Educational Society. The college was founded in 2000 the memory of Shri Rai Saheb Bhanwar Singh Ji of Sothiya. It is affiliated with Barkatullah University.

References

Universities and colleges in Madhya Pradesh
Educational institutions established in 2000
2000 establishments in Madhya Pradesh